Vasivaea is a genus of flowering plants belonging to the family Malvaceae.

Its native range is South America.

Species:
 Vasivaea alchorneoides Baill. 
 Vasivaea podocarpa Kuhlm.

References

Grewioideae
Malvaceae genera